"Honeymoon Fades" is a song by American singer Sabrina Carpenter, released on February 14, 2020 through Hollywood Records. It is Carpenter's first release since her fourth studio album Singular: Act II in July 2019.

Background and release 
In July 2019, Carpenter released her fourth studio album, Singular: Act II. In an interview for the album in June 2019 with Marie Claire, Carpenter revealed that she had already begun work on a fifth studio album. On February 7, 2020, Carpenter teased the song's release by posting a picture with the caption "🍯🌝🌫" (emojis depicting "Honeymoon Fades"). Carpenter announced the song's release on February 13, 2020, calling it her Valentine's Day gift to her fans. It was released the following day. The cover art was shot by Carpenter's sister Sarah Carpenter. Carpenter additionally talked about the song saying:

Composition 
Musically, "Honeymoon Fades" is an R&B song with an atmospheric production. It was composed in the key of F minor with a tempo of 115 beats per minute. Lyrically, "Honeymoon Fades" is about dreaming of a relationship that never loses its spark.

Critical reception 
The song received critical acclaim from critics and fans alike. Mike Nied of Idolator said the song is a "highlight on playlists for the remainder of the lover's holiday (Valentines Day)". Nerisha Penrose of Elle named the song as the tenth best love song of 2020.

Credits and personnel 
Credits adapted from Tidal.

 Sabrina Carpenter – vocals, songwriting
 Tone – production, songwriting, programming
 Akil King – songwriting
 Bianca Atterberry – songwriting
 Daoud Anthony – songwriting
 Josh Deguzman – assistant recording engineering, studio personnel
 Will Quinnell – assistant recording engineering, studio personnel
 Jon Castelli – mixing, studio personnel

Release history

References 

Sabrina Carpenter songs
Songs written by Sabrina Carpenter
Hollywood Records singles
2020 songs
2020 singles
Songs written by Anthony M. Jones
Song recordings produced by Anthony M. Jones
Songs written by Bianca Atterberry